Racing Luck is a 1924 American silent comedy film directed by Herman C. Raymaker and starring Monty Banks, Helen Ferguson, and Lionel Belmore.

Plot
As described in a film magazine review, Mario, a young Italian immigrant, comes to New York City and falls in love with a Rosina, a young woman. They become dancing partners in a cafe. Mario raises a drink to toast the Statue of Liberty but a policeman stops him, the Volstead Act having  established the prohibition of alcoholic drinks. Gang leader Tony Mora is jealous of him and gives Mario some rough moments, but he whips several of Tony's crowd and knocks out the leader. Having learned to drive a Ford, he is induced to enter a road race. Conspirators lock his racing car in high gear and it has no brakes. As the machine cuts circles, hops out into fields, and performs all sorts of incredible antics, the fun grows fast and furious as onlookers alternately rock with laughter and gasp in sympathy with the amateur driver in his hairbreadth escapes from sudden death. While Mario finds himself in serious difficulties, he wins the affections of Rosina and all ends well.

Cast

Preservation
Prints of Racing Luck are held in the collections of Cinémathèque royale de Belgique in Brussels and Gosfilmofond in Moscow.

References

Bibliography
 Munden, Kenneth White. The American Film Institute Catalog of Motion Pictures Produced in the United States, Part 1. University of California Press, 1997.

External links

1924 films
1924 comedy films
American auto racing films
Silent American comedy films
American silent feature films
1920s English-language films
American black-and-white films
Films directed by Herman C. Raymaker
Associated Exhibitors films
1920s American films